The National Veterans Art Museum, formerly the National Vietnam Veterans Art Museum, located at 4041 N. Milwaukee Avenue in Chicago's six corners neighborhood, is dedicated to displaying and studying art produced by veterans from the Vietnam War and other wars and conflicts. Originally a traveling exhibition, while in Chicago it was viewed by Mayor Richard M. Daley, who was so taken by the power of the art that he immediately insisted that the city provide a permanent home for it. The entrance hall had 58,226 dog tags hanging from the ceiling, representing the US soldiers who died in Vietnam. It and the other exhibits have been described as deeply moving.

History
The National Veterans Art Museum is the result of efforts of the Vietnam Veterans Art Group, formed in 1981. The group built a following almost immediately after their first show, Vietnam: Reflexes and Reflections, which opened in October 1981. With increasing popularity and press, the Group grew; veterans from all over the United States began to send in work to be displayed. In 1996 the Vietnam Veterans Art Group established a museum, the only one of its kind at 1801 S. Indiana Ave in Chicago's South Loop.

Mission
The museum's mission is to inspire greater understanding of the impact of war through the collection, preservation, and exhibition of art created by veterans of all U.S. military conflicts. The museum displays military and artistic heritage, helping civilians and veterans make connections across diverse ranges of experience. With nearly 2,500 works of art by more than 250 artists, the museum offers visitors of all ages and backgrounds insight into war from the viewpoint of people who were physically and emotionally involved in military conflicts. In addition, the museum provides an artistic outlet for veterans to work through and express their combat and military service experiences.

References

Museums in Chicago
Vietnam War museums
Vietnam
Art museums and galleries in Illinois
Military and war museums in Illinois